Thomas Riley Watson (born March 11, 1947) is an American attorney and politician who served as a member of the Maine House of Representatives. He resigned in 2010 in order to accept a position with the Maine Workers’ Compensation Board.

References

External links

1947 births
Living people
People from Bath, Maine
People from Minden, Louisiana
Maine Democrats
Naval Postgraduate School alumni
United States Naval Aviators
United States Navy personnel of the Vietnam War
University of Maine School of Law alumni
University of South Carolina alumni
21st-century American politicians